Arturo S. Mom (December 2, 1893 - ? in La Plata Buenos Aires Province) was an Argentine screenwriter and film director of the 1930s, 1940s and 1950s.

He wrote and directed films such as Monte Criollo (1935), Crazy Dandy (1936), Palermo (film) (1937), Our Land of Peace (1939) and Albergue de mujeres (1946).

Selected filmography as director
El Tango en París (1956) 
Albergue de mujeres (1946) 
 A Woman of No Importance (1945)
 Our Land of Peace (1939)
Busco un marido para mi mujer (1938) 
Villa Discordia (1938) 
Palermo  (1937) 
Crazy Dandy (1936) 
Petróleo (1936) 
Monte Criollo (1935)

External links
 

1893 births
Year of death missing
Argentine film directors
Argentine screenwriters
Male screenwriters
Argentine male writers
People from Buenos Aires Province